Cyanothamnus bussellianus is a plant in the citrus family, Rutaceae and is endemic to the south-west of Western Australia. It is a slender perennial herb or shrub with well-spaced, simple leaves and pink, blue or white, four-petalled flowers.

Description
Its branches, leaves and flowers are glabrous. The eight stamens and the style are thin and hairless. Flowering occurs from September to October.

Taxonomy and naming
Cyanothamnus bussellianus was first formally described in 1875 by Ferdinand von Mueller and the description was published in Fragmenta phytographiae Australiae. The type specimen was collected by Charlotte Harriet Bussell near the port in Geographe Bay. In a 2013 paper in the journal Taxon, Marco Duretto and others changed the name to Cyanothamnus bussellianus on the basis of cladistic analysis. The specific epithet (bussellianus) honours the collector of the type specimen.

Distribution and habitat
This boronia grows on rises and outcrops in gravel or over laterite between Eneabba and Ongerup in the Avon Wheatbelt, Esperance Plains, Geraldton Sandplains, Jarrah Forest, Mallee and Swan Coastal Plain biogeographic regions.

Conservation
Cyanothamnus bussellianus is classified as "not threatened" by the Western Australian Government Department of Parks and Wildlife.

References

bussellianus
Flora of Western Australia
Plants described in 1875
Taxa named by Ferdinand von Mueller